Cramerton is a small town in Gaston County, North Carolina, United States. It is a suburb of Charlotte and located east of Gastonia. The population was 4,165 at the 2010 census. A well-known feature is the Cramer Mountain gated development, featuring homes around an 18-hole golf course at Cramer Mountain Country Club.

Geography
Two topographic high points, Berry Mountain, elevation , and Cramer Mountain, approximate elevation , are located in the southwestern part of town.

Cramerton is bisected by the South Fork Catawba River, which makes a sharp S-curve around the center of town. Just southwest of downtown, Duharts Creek flows into the South Fork Catawba. Duharts Creek is formed by the confluence of Armstrong Branch and New Hope Branch on the western edge of town.

Cramerton town limits include a portion of zip code 28012 that encompass the neighborhood of Lakewood and Stuart W. Cramer High School on the eastern shore of the South Fork River.

The town is located seven miles east of  Gastonia and 16 miles west of  Charlotte.

History
Originally named Mayworth, the town was founded in 1906 when J.H. Mayes built a spinning mill along the banks of the South Fork of the Catawba River, just east of Gastonia. In 1910, textile engineer and Thomasville native Stuart Warren Cramer became owner and president of the mill and property. He turned the mill and the surrounding community into a model mill village. In 1922 Cramer changed the name of the mill to Cramerton Mills, and the name of the town to Cramerton. In 1923, Cramer built the Mayflower Weave Mill.

Cramer is credited with designing and equipping "about one-third of the new cotton mills in the South" between 1895 and 1915, and simultaneously acquiring extensive holdings in textile mills. Among Cramer's numerous industrial engineering patents was one for the "Cramer System of Air Conditioning", which included the automatic regulation of temperature and humidity. These early innovations in air conditioning resulted more from the need to remove lint from the air (a persistent problem in the textile mills) than to cool the factory atmosphere. The term "air conditioning" is attributed to Cramer.

In 1946 the mills and homes were sold to Burlington Industries, who in turn sold the homes to residents. The Town of Cramerton incorporated in 1967 and began providing municipal services.

The Mayworth School was listed on the National Register of Historic Places in 2002.

Demographics

2020 census

As of the 2020 United States census, there were 5,296 people, 1,637 households, and 1,165 families residing in the town.

2000 census
As of the census of 2000, there were 2,976 people, 1,169 households, and 859 families residing in the town. The population density was 830.5 people per square mile (321.0/km). There were 1,229 housing units at an average density of 343.0 per square mile (132.5/km). The racial makeup of the town was 94.12% White, 2.35% African American, 0.50% Native American, 1.92% Asian, 0.20% from other races, and 0.91% from two or more races. Hispanic or Latino of any race were 0.37% of the population.

There were 1,169 households, out of which 35.4% had children under the age of 18 living with them, 60.7% were married couples living together, 9.8% had a female householder with no husband present, and 26.5% were non-families. 22.2% of all households were made up of individuals, and 10.0% had someone living alone who was 65 years of age or older. The average household size was 2.54 and the average family size was 2.97.

In the town, the population was spread out, with 25.9% under the age of 18, 5.8% from 18 to 24, 31.7% from 25 to 44, 25.1% from 45 to 64, and 11.5% who were 65 years of age or older. The median age was 37 years. For every 100 females, there were 91.6 males. For every 100 females age 18 and over, there were 88.1 males.

The median income for a household in the town was $47,610, and the median income for a family was $56,071. Males had a median income of $37,679 versus $27,330 for females. The per capita income for the town was $25,503. About 3.3% of families and 4.9% of the population were below the poverty line, including 4.2% of those under age 18 and 10.9% of those age 65 or over.

Government
Cramerton operates under the council-manager form of government with a mayor and a five-member town board and a town manager. In 2011, after 50 years of service, the town ended its contract with the Cramerton Volunteer Fire Department.  The town then worked to create a new town-managed department that provides fire protection for Cramerton as well as neighboring McAdenville. The new Town of Cramerton Fire Department has been in place since 2012.

Cramerton operates its own police department. Based on a contract signed in 2006 by both the McAdenville and Cramerton town councils, officers of the Cramerton Police Department also handle patrol duties within the McAdenville town limits between the hours of 6 PM and 6 AM daily. Cramerton police also assist McAdenville officers with felony criminal investigations.

Cramerton is in South Point Township.

Business and industry
The textile industry has long been central to Cramerton's economy, but globalization has caused many of the local plants to close. Burlington Industries, which had operated the former Cramerton Mills, went bankrupt in 2001. Employers like Eagle Mountain Finishers and Lakewood Dyed Yarns (both subsidiaries of Joan Fabrics Corp.) were closed in 2006 and 2007. Textile companies Brookline Inc. and Wagner Knitting, Inc., have also been affected by the economic downturn. Syncot Fibers and Plastics, Inc., operates a facility in Cramerton specializing in the recycling of nylon.

Transportation
The primary east-west highway passing through Cramerton is U.S. Route 29/U.S. Route 74 (Wilkinson Boulevard). North Carolina Highway 279 (New Hope Road) forms Cramerton's southwest border.

Freight rail service is provided by the Norfolk Southern Railway. While Amtrak's passenger train also follows the Norfolk Southern main line, the nearest station is in Charlotte. The Gastonia station is closed.

Education
Public education in Cramerton is administered by the Gaston County Schools public school system.

Elementary school-age children in Cramerton attend either New Hope Elementary School (south of Cramerton in unincorporated South Point Township), J.B. Page Elementary School (pre-K to grade 1) or Belmont Central Elementary School (grades 2-5) in Belmont, McAdenville Elementary School in McAdenville, or Gardner Park Elementary School in Gastonia.

Most middle school students attend Cramerton Middle School. Portions of the town are zoned to Holbrook Middle School in Lowell or Belmont Middle School in Belmont.

Current high school-age students attend Stuart W. Cramer High School. While the school is located in Cramerton, it has a Belmont mailing address because it is in zip code 28012, which is split between Cramerton and Belmont.

Private schools in Cramerton include Cramerton Christian Academy, with programs for Pre-K through Grade 12. It is operated by Cramerton Freewill Baptist Church.

Points of interest
Mayworth School at 236 Eighth Avenue in Cramerton is listed on the National Register of Historic Places.

Notable people
 Perry Fewell, football coach
 Rube Melton (1917–1971), a pitcher in Major League Baseball
 George Tinkham (1870-1956), longtime Congressman known as "the conscience of the House"; resided here.

References

External links
 
 Gaston Regional Chamber

Towns in Gaston County, North Carolina
Towns in North Carolina
Populated places established in 1906
1906 establishments in North Carolina